Solomeo is a  of the  of Corciano in the Province of Perugia, Umbria, central Italy. It stands at an elevation of 273 metres above sea level. At the time of the Istat census of 2001 it had 436 inhabitants and is found about 9 km south of the city of Corciano. The village is centered mainly on the hill top and the surrounding plain below is irrigated by the waters of the stream Caina.

History
Some Etruscan artifacts have been found in the area, which appear to be dedicated to the Etruscan deity "Lumn", thus giving rise to the syncretic name San Lume which began to designate the place. The "castrum Solomei" fortification to defend the town, was built in 1391 by Meo Giovanni di Nicola and Peter Galassi Tanoli, at the request of the Magistrates of Perugia. In 1402 the town was taken and plundered by the papal troops, and again the following year by Perugia.

Today Solomeo has been largely restored by   its world-famous  resident, Brunello Cucinelli.

Places of interest
 Church of Santa Maria di Mandoleto (18th century);
 Medieval town center of Solomeo;
 St Bartholomew's Church (18th century) with frescoes Mazzerioli, a painting of the school of Perugino, some paintings attributed to 'Appiah;
 Castle Montefrondoso (12th century);
 Villa Antinori-Touch (19th century).
 Cucinelli Theatre, opened in September 2008, is a new theater in classical style.

External links

Solomeo at Brunello Cucinelli.com

References 

Frazioni of Corciano